Mykhailo Serhiiovych Hrushevsky (in Chełm – 24 November 1934, in Kislovodsk) was a Ukrainian academician, politician, historian and statesman who was one of the most important figures of the Ukrainian national revival of the early 20th century. He is often considered the country's greatest modern historian, the foremost organiser of scholarship, the leader of the pre-revolution Ukrainian national movement, the head of the Central Rada (Ukraine's 1917–1918 revolutionary parliament), and a leading cultural figure in the Ukrainian SSR during the 1920s.

Early life

Hrushevsky was born on 29 September 1866 to a Ukrainian noble family in Kholm (Chełm), in Congress Poland, an autonomous polity in the Russian Empire. Hrushevsky grew up in Tiflis, where he attended a local school. His spiritual native land became Podillia, in the area of the village of Sestrynivka, Podillia Governorate. There, his mother, Glafira Zakharivna Okopova, was born into a family of Orthodox priests. Glafira married Serhii Fedorovych Hrushevsky, who had come to Kholm to teach Russian language at a Greco-Catholic gymnasium in 1865. Serhii Fedorovych's father, Fedir Hrushevsky was a highly-decorated official (his awards included the two Orders of Saint Anna and the Bronze Cross, and a title of nobility). Upon enrolling into Saint Volodymyr University, in Kyiv, Mykhailo has received blessings from his grandfather who has graduated from the History Department of this university. Mykhailo spoke warmly of his parents and described them as real patriots of Ukraine, who managed to instill a sense of national pride in their children.

Historian
Hrushevsky wrote his first academic book, Bar Starostvo: Historical Notes: XV-XVIII, on the history of Bar, Ukraine. As a historian, he authored the first detailed scholarly synthesis of Ukrainian history, his ten-volume History of Ukraine-Rus, which was published in the Ukrainian language and covered the period from prehistory to the 1660s. In the work, he balanced a commitment to the ordinary Ukrainian people with an appreciation for native Ukrainian political entities, autonomous polities, which steadily increased in the final volumes of his master work. In general, his approach combined rationalist enlightenment principles with a romantic commitment to the cause of the nation and positivist methodology to produce a highly-authoritative history of his native land and people. Hrushevsky also wrote a multi-volume History of Ukrainian Literature, an Outline History of the Ukrainian People and a very popular Illustrated History of Ukraine, which appeared in both Ukrainian and Russian editions. In addition, he wrote numerous specialised studies in which he displayed a very acute critical acumen. His personal bibliography has over 2000 separate titles.

In Hrushevsky's varied historical writings, certain basic ideas come to the fore. Firstly, he saw continuity in Ukrainian history from ancient times to his own. Thus, he claimed the ancient Ukrainian steppe cultures from Scythia to Kyivan Rus to the Cossacks as part of Ukrainian heritage. He viewed the Principality of Galicia–Volhynia as the sole legitimate heir of Kyivan Rus, which opposed the official scheme of Russian history, which claimed Kyivan Rus for the Vladimir-Suzdal Principality and Imperial Russia. Secondly, to give real depth to the continuity, Hrushevsky stressed the role of the common people, the "popular masses" as he called them, throughout the eras. Thus, popular revolts against the various foreign states that ruled Ukraine were also a major theme. Thirdly, Hrushevsky always emphasised native Ukrainian factors rather than international ones as the causes of various phenomena. Thus, he was an anti-Normanist, who stressed the Slavic origins of Rus, internal discord as the primary reason for the fall of Kyivan Rus and the native Ukrainian ethnic makeup and origins of the Ukrainian Cossacks. (He considered runaway serfs especially important in the last regard.) Also, he stressed the national aspect to the Ukrainian Renaissance of the 16th and 17th centuries and considered that the great revolt of Bohdan Khmelnytsky and the Cossacks against the Polish–Lithuanian Commonwealth to be largely a national and social phenomenon, rather than simply a religious phenomenon. Thus, continuity nativism, and populism characterised his general histories.

On the role of statehood in Hrushevsky's historical thought, contemporary scholars still do not agree. Some believe that Hrushevsky retained a populist mistrust of the state throughout his career and that it was reflected by his deep democratic convictions, but others believe that Hrushevsky gradually became more and more for Ukrainian statehood in his various writings and that to be is reflected in his political work on the construction of a Ukrainian national state, during the revolution in 1917 and 1918.

Scholar
As an organiser of scholarship, Hrushevsky oversaw the transformation of the Shevchenko Literary Society, based in the province of Halychyna (Galicia), Austria-Hungary, into a new Shevchenko Scientific Society, which published hundreds of volumes of scholarly literature before the First World War and quickly grew to serve as an unofficial academy of sciences for Ukrainian on both sides of the border with Russia. After the Russian Revolution of 1905, Hrushevsky organised the Ukrainian Scientific Society in Kyiv in 1907 that served as a prototype to the future Academy of Sciences. After the 1917-1921 revolution, he founded the Ukrainian Sociological Institute in exile in Vienna. After his return to Ukraine in the 1920s, he became a major figure of the new All-Ukrainian Academy of Sciences in Kyiv in 1923.

Politician

Before 1917
As a political leader, Hrushevsky first became active in Austrian Halychyna, where he spoke out against Polish political predominance and Ruthenian particularism and supported a national Ukrainian identity that would unite both eastern and western parts of the country. In 1899, he was a cofounder of the Galician-based National Democratic Party, which looked forward to eventual Ukrainian independence. After 1905, Hrushevsky advised the Ukrainian Club in the Russian State Duma, or Parliament.

Ukrainian Revolution

In 1917, Hrushevsky was elected head of the revolutionary parliament, the Ukrainian Central Rada, in Kyiv and gradually guided it from Ukrainian national autonomy within a democratic Russia through to complete independence. He chaired the Congress of the Peoples of Russia. Hrushevsky was then clearly revealed to be a radical democrat and a socialist. On February 17, 1918, The New York Times published an article by Hrushevsky that outlined Ukraine's struggle for self-government. Following the German-supported coup of General Pavlo Skoropadsky, he went into hiding. Hrushevsky felt that Skoropadsky had perverted the cause of Ukrainian statehood by associating it with social conservatism. Hrushevsky returned to public politics after the overthrow of Skoropadsky by the Directory. He did not, however, approve of the Directory and soon found himself in conflict with it. In 1919, he emigrated to Vienna, Austria, having acquired a mandate from the Ukrainian Party of Socialist Revolutionaries to co-ordinate the activities of its representatives abroad.

Emigration and return to Ukraine
While an émigré, Hrushevsky began to become pro-Bolshevik. Along with other members of the Ukrainian Party of Socialist Revolutionaries, he formed the Foreign Delegation of the Ukrainian Party of Socialist Revolutionaries, which advocated reconciliation with the Bolshevik government. Though the group was critical of the Bolsheviks, especially because if their centralism and repressive activities in Ukraine, it felt that the criticisms had to be put aside because the Bolsheviks were the leaders of the international revolution. Hrushevsky and his group petitioned the Ukrainian SSR government to legalise the Ukrainian Party of Socialist Revolutionaries and to allow the members of the Foreign Delegation to return. The Ukrainian SSR government was unwilling to do so. By 1921, the Foreign Delegation of the Ukrainian Party of Socialist Revolutionaries had ended its activity, but all of its members returned to Ukraine, including Hrushevsky, who did so in 1924.

Later life and death
Back in Ukraine, Hrushevsky concentrated on academic work. Above all, he continued writing his monumental History of Ukraine-Rusʹ. Although political conditions prevented his return to public politics, he was caught up in the Stalinist purge of the Ukrainian intelligentsia. In 1931, after a long campaign against Hrushevsky in the Soviet press, he was exiled to Moscow, where his health deteriorated due to difficult conditions and persecution. In 1934, while vacationing at the Academy of Sciences resort in Kislovodsk in the Caucasus, he died soon after a routine minor surgery at the age of 68. He was buried at the Bakiove cemetery in Kyiv.

At the time of his death, he was being shadowed by the Soviet GPU secret police after reports (probably fabricated by the GPU in Ukraine) were sent to Moscow that had been considering defection to the West, and afterwards the government resolution and approval of his official obituary were published remarkably promptly, as if already prepared: the suspicious circumstances effectively made him a martyr for the Ukrainian cause.

Legacy

Hrushevsky is presently regarded as Ukraine's greatest 20th-century scholar and one of the most prominent Ukrainian statesmen in Ukraine's history, and he is still famous in Ukraine. Hrushevsky has been more lionized than Volodymyr Vynnychenko and Symon Petliura were, despite both playing more important roles during the Ukrainian People's Republic, but Vynnychenko was too left wing and Petliura too associated with violence to make a good symbolic figure.

Hrushevsky's portrait appears on the 50 hryvnia note. A museum in Kyiv and another in Lviv are devoted to his memory, and monuments to him have been erected in both cities. A street in Kyiv bears his name houses and the Verkhovna Rada (parliament) and many governmental offices. The Ukrainian Academy of Sciences recently initiated the publication of his Collected Works, in 50 volumes.

Family
Mykhailo Hrushevsky had two siblings: a brother, Oleksandr, and a sister, Hanna.
 Oleksandr Hrushevsky (1877–1943) was married to Olha Hrushevska (Parfenenko) (1876–1961).
 Hanna Shamraieva had two children, Serhii and Olha.

His wife, Maria-Ivanna Hrushevska (November 8, 1868 – September 19, 1948), was from 1917 was a member of the Central Rada and a treasurer for the Ukrainian National Theatre.

Bibliography
 Hrushevsky, M., Bar Starostvo: Historical Notes: XV-XVIII, St. Volodymyr University Publishing House, Velyka-Vasyl'kivska, Building no. 29-31, Kyiv, Ukraine, 1894; Lviv, Ukraine, pp. 1 – 623, 1996.

References

Further reading

 Dmytro Doroshenko, "A Survey of Ukrainian Historiography," Annals of the Ukrainian Academy of Arts and Sciences in the US, V-VI, 4 (1957), 262-74: online.
 Thomas M. Prymak, Mykhailo Hrushevsky: The Politics of National Culture (Toronto: University of Toronto Press, 1987). .
 Lubomyr R. Wynar, Mykhailo Hrushevsky: Ukrainian-Russian Confrontation in Historiography (Toronto-New York-Munich: Ukrainian Historical Association, 1988).
 Thomas M. Prymak, "Mykhailo Hrushevsky in History and Legend," Ukrainian Quarterly,LX, 3-4 (2004), pp. 216–30. A brief summary of this author's views.
 Serhii Plokhy, Unmaking Imperial Russia: Mykhailo Hrushevsky and the Writing of Ukrainian History (Toronto: University of Toronto Press, 2005). .
 Pyrig, Ruslan. Mykhailo Grushevsky and the Bolshevik Rule: The Price of Compromises in Zerkalo Nedeli, September 30, 2006. Available in Russian and Ukraine
 Christopher Gilley, The 'Change of Signposts' in the Ukrainian Emigration. A Contribution to the History of Sovietophilism in the 1920s, Ibidem: Stuttgart, 2009, Chapter 4.

External links

 Collection of Hrushevsky's Works at the Canadian Institute of Ukrainian Studies press
 Oleksander Ohloblyn, Lubomyr Wynar. Hrushevsky, Mykhailo in the Encyclopedia of Ukraine, vol. 2 (1989).
 
 Yershova, O. Unknown Ukraine: Mykhailo Hrushevsky. Film 86. "Kyivnaukfilm", 1993.

1866 births
1934 deaths
People from Chełm
People from Lublin Governorate
Ukrainian people in the Russian Empire
Ukrainian nobility
Society of Ukrainian Progressors members
Ukrainian Socialist-Revolutionary Party politicians
Ukrainian nationalists
Leaders of Ukraine
Members of the Central Council of Ukraine
20th-century Ukrainian historians
Historians of Ukraine
Ukrainian editors
Members of the Shevchenko Scientific Society
Taras Shevchenko National University of Kyiv alumni
Ukrainian revolutionaries
Russian Constituent Assembly members
Presidents of the Ukrainian People's Republic
Heads of state of Ukraine
Ukrainian exiles in the Russian Empire
Burials at Baikove Cemetery
Full Members of the USSR Academy of Sciences
Magazine founders
19th-century Ukrainian historians